Pitcher and Violin is an oil-on-canvas painting by the French artist Georges Braque, created in 1909–10. It was made at the beginning of the development of what would be analytical cubism. The painting is held the Kunstmuseum, in Basel.

History
Pitcher and Violin was part of a series of remarkable still lifes that Braque painted in 1910–1912. The painting depicts a violin and a pitcher, but far from the tradition of typical still lives: the outlines of the objects are extremely abstract and monochrome. This style is typical of the stage of analytical cubism, which flourished in 1910–1912.

Description and analysis
Braque's work was characterized by his use of illusionistic techniques, exemplified in this painting by the trompe l'oeil image of a nail from which the still life depicted on canvas appears to hang, thereby emphasizing the deliberate two-dimensionality of space. With this canvas, Braque postulates and actualizes the main idea of ​​analytical cubism: "under the analytical gaze of a cubist, an object is divided into many separate geometric elements, angles, faces, which are then arranged in a certain way on the plane of the canvas, forming semi-abstract ... compositions".

Simultaneous tendencies, to which trompe-l'oeil belongs, are characteristic of the art of that time, since the cubists strive to depict reality in its entirety, from all angles and points of view, actualizing every moment of the object's being. Thus, the objects in the paintings are deprived of material foundations, giving way to geometric forms, and the paintings themselves tend to resemble abstract schemes. The illusiveness, monochrome and deliberate "flatness" of the objects takes them out of the traditional context and forces viewers to rethink them in new categories.

References

1910 paintings
Paintings by Georges Braque
Cubist paintings
Still life paintings
Musical instruments in art
Trompe-l'œil paintings